Gloria Hemingway (born Gregory Hancock Hemingway, November 12, 1931 – October 1, 2001) was an American physician and writer who was the third and youngest child of author Ernest Hemingway.

A good athlete and a crack shot, Gloria longed to be a typical Hemingway hero and trained as a professional hunter in Africa, but her alcoholism prevented her gaining a license, as it also cost her her medical license in America. Gloria maintained a long-running feud with her father, stemming from a 1951 incident when her arrest for entering a bar "in drag" caused an argument between Ernest and Gloria's mother Pauline. Pauline died from an stress-related condition the next day, which Ernest blamed on Gloria and Gloria later believed to have been caused by Ernest. Her bestselling 1976 memoir of her father, Papa: A Personal Memoir, was seen by some to reflect troubles of her own. These included wearing women's clothes, which she ascribed to gender dysphoria.

Early life
Born in Kansas City, Missouri, to novelist Ernest Hemingway and his second wife Pauline Pfeiffer, she was called 'Gigi' or 'Gig' in childhood and was, according to a close observer, "a tremendous athlete" and a "crack shot". As an adult, she preferred the name 'Greg'. At the age of 12, she was wearing Martha Gellhorn's stockings almost daily. Ernest caught her wearing them, and had an outburst of anger that left an impression on Gloria for decades. However, a few days later he said to her: "Gigi, we come from a strange tribe, you and I." Hemingway attended the Canterbury School, a Catholic prep school in Connecticut, graduating in 1949. She dropped out of St. John's College, Annapolis, after one year and worked for a time as an aircraft mechanic before moving to California in 1951.

Gloria married against her father's wishes. In September 1951, Hemingway was arrested for entering the women's bathroom in a Los Angeles movie theater dressed in women's clothing. Pauline Pfeiffer died in October 1951, the day after a phone call with Ernest in which the two parents argued about their child, who had recently married. According to Hemingway biographer Michael Reynolds the "conversation degenerated into accusations, blame-laying, vituperation, and general misunderstanding." Pauline died of hypertension, but during the autopsy it was discovered she suffered from a rare tumor that "secretes abnormal amounts of adrenaline causing extremely high blood pressure." Ernest blamed Gloria for Pauline's death, and she was deeply disturbed by the accusation. It was years before Gloria and Ernest spoke with each other, and Gloria never saw her father alive again.

Gloria Hemingway retreated to Africa, where she drank alcohol and shot elephants. She spent the next three years in Africa as an apprentice professional hunter but failed to obtain a license because of her drinking. She joined the United States Army as a private in October 1956 and served for a brief period. She was stationed at Fort Bragg, North Carolina. She suffered from mental illness, was institutionalized for a time, and received several dozen treatments with electroconvulsive therapy. Of another period shooting elephants she wrote: "I went back to Africa to do more killing. Somehow it was therapeutic." Not until nearly a decade later, in 1960, did she feel strong enough to resume her medical studies and respond to her father's charges. She wrote her father a bitter letter, detailing the medical facts of her mother's death and blaming Ernest for the tragedy. The next year, Ernest Hemingway killed himself, and again Gloria wrestled with guilt over the death of a parent.

She obtained a medical degree from the University of Miami Medical School in 1964.

Relationship with Ernest Hemingway

In addition to the conflict over him finding Gloria in Martha Gellhorn's clothing, Ernest and his child were estranged for many years, beginning when Gloria was 19 and arrested for entering a women's bathroom in women's clothes. Ernest blamed Pauline, and the enormous stress triggered an underlying condition and caused her death, which he blamed on his child. Ernest also said the child had "the biggest dark side in the family except me". As an attempt at reconciliation, Hemingway sent her father a telegram in October 1954 to congratulate him on being awarded the Nobel Prize and received $5,000 in return. They had intermittent contact thereafter.

One such example was a letter from Hemingway to Ernest in reply to one which referenced her gender exploration stating "The clothes business is something that I have never been able to control, understand basically very little, and I am terribly ashamed of. I have lied about it before, mainly to people I am fond of, because I was afraid they would not like me as much if they had found out."

Gloria wrote a short account of her father's life and their strained relationship, Papa: A Personal Memoir, that became a bestseller. When it appeared in 1976, Norman Mailer wrote in the preface, "There is nothing slavish here....For once, you can read a book about Hemingway and not have to decide whether you like him or not." The New York Times called it "a small miracle" and "artfully elliptical" in presenting "gloriously romantic adventures" with "a thin cutting edge of malice". Hemingway wrote of her own ambitions in the shadow of her father's fame: "What I really wanted to be was a Hemingway hero." Of her father she wrote: "The man I remembered was kind, gentle, elemental in his vastness, tormented beyond endurance, and although we always called him papa, it was out of love, not fear." She quoted her father as telling her: "You make your own luck, Gig" and "You know what makes a good loser? Practice." Time magazine criticized the author's "churlishness" and called her work "a bitter jumble of unsorted resentments and anguished love." Her daughter Lorian responded to Papa with a letter to Time that said, "I would also like to know what type of person the author is...I haven't seen him for eight years...I think it sad that I learn more about him by reading articles and gossip columns than from my own communication with him."

According to her wife Valerie, Hemingway enjoyed her father's portrayal of her as Andrew in Islands in the Stream (1970) and later used the text as the epigraph to her memoir of her father. Valerie included this text as the epigraph to her own tribute to Gloria Hemingway written two years after her death:

Middle years
In the course of her first four marriages, Gloria Hemingway had eight children: Patrick, Edward, Sean, Brendan, Vanessa, Maria, John, and Lorian. One of her marriages, to Valerie Danby-Smith, Ernest Hemingway's secretary, lasted almost 20 years. Gloria's fourth marriage, to Ida Mae Galliher, ended in divorce in 1995 after three years, though they continued to live together and remarried in 1997. After Galliher's death in 2014, it was revealed that she was a post-op transgender woman.

In 1972, Maia Rodman, Hemingway's childhood tennis coach and a family friend who had fallen in love with her, dedicated her book The Life and Death of a Brave Bull to Gloria.

She practiced medicine in the 1970s and 1980s, first in New York and then as a rural family doctor in Montana, first in Fort Benton and later as the medical officer for Garfield County, based in Jordan, Montana. Interviewed there, she said: "When I smell the sagebrush or see the mountains, or a vast clean stream, I love those things. Some of my happiest memories of childhood were associated with the West." In 1988, authorities in Montana declined to renew Hemingway's medical license because of her alcoholism. Hemingway battled bipolar disorder, alcoholism, and drug abuse for many years.

Hemingway and her brothers tried to protect their father's name and their inheritance by taking legal action to stop the popular local celebrations called "Hemingway Days" in Key West, Florida. In 1999, they collaborated in creating a business venture, Hemingway Ltd., to market the family name as "an up-scale lifestyle accessory brand". Their first venture created controversy by putting the Hemingway name on a line of shotguns.

Gender identity
Throughout her life, Hemingway experienced gender dysphoria and wore women's clothes on a number of occasions, mostly privately and occasionally going out. When Hemingway was 12 years old, Ernest walked in on her dressed in Martha Gellhorn's stockings, a near-daily activity at the time, and went berserk. A Hemingway biographer, Donald Junkins, stated that Hemingway, when she was 60 years old, told him that "[she] never got over it: the raging wrath of [her] father". However, a few days after the childhood encounter Ernest counseled "Gigi, we come from a strange tribe, you and I." In 1946 Ernest's wife Mary accused the maid of stealing her lingerie, but later discovered the items under 14-year-old Hemingway's mattress. When Ernest rebuked his child for stealing from Mary years later, Hemingway responded "The clothes business is something that I have never been able to control, understand basically very little, and I am terribly ashamed of. I have lied about it before, mainly to people I am fond of, because I was afraid they would not like me as much if they had found out."

Wife Valerie wrote:

Hemingway considered gender-affirming surgery as early as 1973. Hemingway tried conversion therapy to no avail. In a 1986 interview with The Washington Post, Hemingway stated "I've spent hundreds of thousands of dollars trying not to be a transvestite." Meyer's 2020 biography noted that "despite psychiatric help and shock treatments" (often self-prescribed), Hemingway "remained an obsessive transvestite." She had bottom surgery in 1995 and began using the name Gloria on occasion. Hemingway, presenting as a man, remarried Galliher in 1997 in Washington state, for at the time same-sex marriage in Washington was illegal.

Hemingway's public persona remained male. As Gregory, she gave interviews about her father as late as 1999. In July of that year she attended events marking the centenary of Ernest Hemingway's birth in Oak Park, Illinois. She also spoke at the dedication of the Hemingway-Pfeiffer Museum in her mother's family home in Piggott, Arkansas, when it opened on July 4, 1999.

Hemingway had breast implant surgery on one breast and then had it reversed, but the autopsy and police report both noted the presence of breasts. She was sometimes seen in women's attire; yet, dressed as a man, she frequented a local tavern and presented as what a patron called "just one of the guys", though they knew about her feminine persona and clothing and weren't bothered.

On September 24, 2001, Hemingway wore a black cocktail dress to a party and used the name Vanessa; she did not become drunk and was regarded as happy by friends, many who had never been introduced to her as a woman before. Hemingway also stated the sex-change was the best thing she'd ever done. Arrested the next day, she first gave the police the name Greg Hemingway, then changed it to Gloria and was detained in the Miami-Dade Women's Detention Center, where she died 5 days later.

Death
Hemingway died on October 1, 2001, of hypertension and cardiovascular disease in Miami-Dade Women's Detention Center. That day, Hemingway was due in court to answer charges of indecent exposure and resisting arrest without violence. Hemingway had been living in Florida for more than ten years.

In most obituaries, she was called "Gregory", but Time magazine published a brief notice of the death of "Gloria Hemingway, 69, transsexual youngest son turned daughter of novelist Ernest Hemingway" and noted the novelist once said Gloria had "the biggest dark side in the family except me". The gravestone reads: "Dr. Gregory Hancock Hemingway 1931–2001". 

The media response to Hemingway's death has been condemned for not referring to Hemingway as "Gloria" and for portraying gender variance as inherently pathological. Shortly after Hemingway died, The Advocate published an article discussing the coverage of her death. In it, Vanessa Edwards Foster, spokeswoman for the National Transgender Advocacy Coalition discussed how family rejection contributes to depression, how Hemingway had to fight for years to be recognized, especially growing up as Ernest Hemingway's son, and how transgender people felt the coverage was lurid, degrading, and dehumanizing. Lorian Hemingway sympathized, and stated "I am proud of him for going through with it. I wish I could have said that to him, and I hope it brought him some peace in the years he had left. My husband and I were talking about it, and if there was anything good about those last hours, it was that he was in the women's cell, where he would have chosen to be."

Hemingway is buried next to her father and half-brother Jack in the cemetery at Ketchum, Idaho. She left two wills. One will left most of the $7 million estate to Galliher. The other left most of it to Hemingway's children. The children challenged the will that named Galliher as heir, claiming that Galliher was not legally Hemingway's widow given that Hemingway's home state of Florida did not recognize same-sex marriages. The parties eventually reached an undisclosed settlement.

Children
Daughter Lorian Hemingway wrote about Gloria (whom she referred to as her father) in the 1999 book Walk on Water: A Memoir.

Son Edward, an author and artist, has written and/or illustrated 11 books, including the children's books Bad Apple, Tough Cookie, and Pigeon and Cat.

Son John wrote the critically acclaimed memoir Strange Tribe: A Family Memoir.

Son Patrick is a professional photographer based in Vancouver, British Columbia, Canada.

Son Seán is a curator of Greek and Roman Art at the Metropolitan Museum of Art in New York City.

Notes

References

Further reading

External links

Hemingway-Pfeiffer timeline
Childhood photo

1931 births
2001 deaths
Writers from Kansas City, Missouri
Leonard M. Miller School of Medicine alumni
American primary care physicians
Hemingway family
People with bipolar disorder
People from Ketchum, Idaho
People from Fort Benton, Montana
People from Jordan, Montana
American hunters
Canterbury School (Connecticut) alumni
Transgender women
American transgender people
United States Army soldiers